Lock Laces are elastic no tie shoelaces manufactured and distributed by Positive Distribution LLC. The Lock Laces system consists of two elastic shoelaces that are fastened at the tongue of the shoe by two double-eyelet, adjustable locking mechanisms and secured into place by two cord clips. Frank Sutton is the president and CEO of Positive Distribution LLC, the owner of the Lock Laces trademark, patent, and associated intellectual property.

History
Eric Jackson originally invented Lock Laces for personal use when he became frustrated that his shoelaces would become untied while playing sports. His original design utilized elastic shoestrings and barrel cord locks. After he was laid off from his job as a light bulb salesman, and a personal friend suggested that he sell his invention, Jackson formed Street Smart LLC in order to market Lock Laces®.

In 1999, Jackson began marketing Lock Laces while assembling the product in his mother's basement. Jackson later began contracting out the packaging and assembly of Lock Laces to Opportunity Builders, Inc., a Millersville, Maryland-based nonprofit that offers employment opportunities for adults with developmental and physical disabilities.

In 2011, Lock Laces became a national sponsor of the Special Olympics’ Healthy Athletes Fit Feet program. Lock Laces has also partnered with the American Indoor Football Association.

Positive Distribution LLC
In 2016, Positive Distribution LLC purchased the Lock Laces® patent, trademark, and associated intellectual property from Street Smart LLC. Today, Positive Distribution LLC manufactures and distributes Lock Laces® in over 30 countries worldwide.

External links
 Lock Laces

Footwear accessories